The 2014 Cleveland Browns season was the franchise's 66th season as a professional sports franchise and its 62nd as a member of the National Football League. It was the first under new head coach Mike Pettine and general manager Ray Farmer. The Browns improved upon their 4–12 record from 2013, finishing 7–9. The team started the season 6–3 with sole possession of the AFC North lead, but lost six of their last seven games to finish 7–9 and fail to make the playoffs for the 12th consecutive year, the longest postseason drought in franchise history. This also marked the Browns' seventh consecutive season with a losing record.

Offseason

Personnel changes

Coaching staff changes
On December 29, 2013, the Browns fired head coach Rob Chudzinski. In his only season as coach, Chudzinski posted a record of 4–12, including a 7-game losing streak to end the season, although he ended the Browns' 11-game losing streak to the division rival Baltimore Ravens. Offensive coordinator Norv Turner left the team to take the same position with the Minnesota Vikings, and defensive coordinator Ray Horton took the same position with the Tennessee Titans.

On January 23, 2014, the Browns hired former Buffalo Bills' defensive coordinator Mike Pettine as head coach. This will be Pettine's first opportunity as an NFL head coach.

On January 27, the Browns hired former Bills' linebackers coach Jim O'Neil as defensive coordinator. O'Neil has served as a defensive assistant under Pettine with both the Jets and the Bills.

Also, on January 27, the Browns filled out their defensive coaching staff by adding three assistant coaches who worked under Pettine in Buffalo: Chuck Driesbach as linebackers coach, Brian Fleury as assistant linebackers coach and Jeff Hafley as secondary coach.  The Browns also hired former Tampa Bay Buccaneers' tight ends coach Brian Angelichio to the same position and retained assistant secondary coach Bobby Babich, special teams coach Chris Tabor, and assistant special teams coach Shawn Mennenga from Chudzinski's coaching staff.

On February 3, the Browns hired former Washington Redskins' offensive coordinator Kyle Shanahan to take the same position with the team. Shanahan, the son of Super Bowl champion head coach Mike Shanahan, served as the Houston Texans' offensive coordinator from 2008 to 2009, and the Redskins' offensive coordinator from 2010 to 2013.

Front office changes 

On February 11, the Browns fired general manager Mike Lombardi and promoted assistant general manager Ray Farmer to take his place as GM. In addition, CEO Joe Banner resigned from his role with the team.

Also on February 11, the Browns hired Bill Kuharich as assistant general manager to Farmer.  Kuharich worked with Farmer in the Kansas City Chiefs player personnel department, and has also worked in the New Orleans Saints player personnel department.

Roster changes

Free agents

Releases

Signings

Draft

Notes
 The Browns traded their original first-round selection (No. 4 overall) to the Buffalo Bills in exchange for the Bills' first round selection (No. 9 overall) and their 2015 first and fourth round selections.
 The Browns then traded the No. 9 overall selection, along with their fifth round selection (No. 145 overall) to the Minnesota Vikings in exchange for the No. 8 overall selection.
 The Browns acquired an additional first-round selection (No. 26 overall) in a trade that sent running back Trent Richardson to the Indianapolis Colts.
 The Browns traded the No. 26 selection, along with a third round selection (No. 83 overall), to the Philadelphia Eagles in exchange for the No. 22 overall selection.
 The Browns acquired an additional third-round selection (No. 83 overall) in a trade that sent the team's 2013 fourth-round selection to the Pittsburgh Steelers.  This selection was later traded to the Eagles (see above).
 The Browns acquired an additional fourth-round selection (No. 127 overall) in a trade that sent the team's 2013 fifth-round selection to the Indianapolis Colts.
The Browns did not have selections from rounds 5–7 as a result of the following trades:
 Trading the No. 145 selection to the Minnesota Vikings (see above).
 Trading the No. 106 and No. 180 selections to the San Francisco 49ers in exchange for the No. 94 selection.
 Trading traded the No. 218 selection to the Baltimore Ravens in exchange for their sixth-round selection in the 2015 NFL Draft.

Undrafted free agent signings

Gordon suspension
On May 9, it was announced that wide receiver Josh Gordon could face a possible season-long suspension due to a fourth failed drug test. On July 4, 2014 Josh Gordon was arrested for DWI in Raleigh, NC. On August 27, the suspension was upheld after Gordon's appeal. On September 12, after the NFL and the NFLPA approved a new drug testing program, Gordon's suspension was retroactively reduced to 10 games. On November 17, his reinstatement was officially announced and he returned Week 12 at the Georgia Dome, against the Atlanta Falcons, on November 23.

Preseason

Schedule

Regular season

Schedule
The Browns had no games west of the Mississippi River in 2014, by virtue of their conference rotation with NFC South and AFC South division opponents, and common position Bills and Raiders – the Raiders being based in the Pacific Time Zone but scheduled to play the Browns at FirstEnergy Stadium. Their only game outside of the Eastern Time Zone was in Nashville, Tennessee against the Tennessee Titans in Week 5. Their November 6 game in Week 10 was their only scheduled national television appearance on the NFL Network, against the Cincinnati Bengals.

Note: Intra-division opponents are in bold text.

Game summaries

Week 1: at Pittsburgh Steelers

The Steelers dominated the first half, and the Browns trailed 27–3 at halftime. However, the Browns scored 24 straight points in the second half to tie the game at 27–27. The comeback attempt fell short as Steelers K Shaun Suisham kicked a 41-yard game-winning field goal as time expired. With the loss, the Browns lost their tenth straight season opener, setting an NFL record. It was also their eleventh consecutive road loss to the Steelers.

Week 2: vs. New Orleans Saints

This was the Browns' first home opener win since 2004, and also marked Johnny Manziel's NFL debut. Rookie Terrence West, who had more than 2,500 all-purpose yards at Division I (FCS) Towson University, ran for 68 yards and one touchdown. Billy Cundiff hit the game-winning field goal as time expired.

Week 3: vs. Baltimore Ravens

For the Browns, this would mark the third straight regular season game that they played in: that would be decided by 3 or fewer points, and that would have a game-winning field goal in the final ten seconds of the fourth quarter.  In a tightly contested match, the Browns led 21–17 heading into the fourth. A series of errors (including a missed 50 yard field goal try and a blocked field goal attempt) prevented them from scoring, while the Ravens scored 6 unanswered.  Throughout the first three periods, the Browns were 5/7 on third down conversions; they were 0/4 on third down conversions and gained only one first down in the decisive fourth quarter.  Ravens K Justin Tucker kicked the game-winning field goal as time expired.   With the loss, the Browns suffered their first home loss of the season as their record fell to 1–2 entering the bye week.  The Browns also fell to 1–12 against the Ravens with Joe Flacco as the QB under center.  Victories by the Bengals and the Steelers would leave the Browns in sole possession of last place in the AFC North.

The Browns were the only team in the NFL not to have a turnover in the first three games of the season.

Week 5: at Tennessee Titans

This marked the Browns’ solitary game outside the Eastern time zone during the  season. The Browns ended a 7-game away losing streak and improved to 2–2 with the win. For the fourth time this season, the Browns participated in a game that was decided by 3 or fewer points. It was also the fourth time in as many games that the winning score was produced with less than 2 minutes to go in the 4th quarter.  The game was aggressive, with 14 penalties for 142 yards, and the ejection of the Titans' linebacker Derrick Morgan.  The Titans dominated in the early minutes, scoring the first 14 points of the contest and leaping out to a 28–3 lead.  Despite trailing by as many as 25 points in the second quarter, the Browns scored the final 26 points of the game while the Titans failed to score any points in the second half. Travis Benjamin caught the game-winning TD pass from Brian Hoyer with 69 seconds left in the game.

The Browns' 25-point rally represented the largest comeback in franchise history and the largest comeback by a road team in NFL history. For his outstanding play on punt and kick coverage, Browns DL Tank Carder was recognized as the AFC Special Teams Player of the Week.

Week 6: vs. Pittsburgh Steelers

This was the second and final regular season meeting between the two teams.  The Browns snapped a four-game losing streak to the Steelers with a 31–10 blowout victory.  They also won their first divisional game of the season, ending a five-game losing streak to division foes.  The Steelers led 3–0 after the first quarter.  However, the Browns scored 21 straight points in the second quarter, building a 21–3 halftime lead. Adding a field goal in the third quarter and a touchdown in the fourth, the Browns created an insurmountable 31–3 lead.  The Steelers’ late touchdown in the fourth quarter produced the final score. Steelers’ QB Ben Roethlisberger suffered only his second career loss in 20 career games against the Browns.  For Cleveland, the 21-point margin of victory was the most lopsided win over Pittsburgh since they routed them 51–0 in a Week 1 matchup during the 1989 season.  The Browns moved into third place in the AFC North with a 3–2 record while the Steelers fell into fourth place with a 3–3 record.

Week 7: at Jacksonville Jaguars

The Browns entered this game with a 3–2 record, coming off a blowout victory over the Steelers and were looking to win their third consecutive game.  Meanwhile, the Jaguars entered with a 0–6 record, and a 9-game losing streak, coming off a tough loss to the Tennessee Titans.  Despite being heavy favorites to win this matchup, the Browns were routed 24–6.  The Browns led 6–0 late in the first half and had the opportunity to kick a field goal and go up 9–0.  Instead, Browns HC Mike Pettine opted to go for it on 4th & 1. The conversion attempt failed, and within seconds, the Jaguars scored a touchdown to close out the half, leading 7–6.  Following a lost fumble by Brian Hoyer, the Jaguars added a field goal to make it 10–6.  In the fourth, the Browns finally imploded. KR Jordan Poyer attempted to catch the punt at the Browns’ 2-yard line; the ball went off his facemask, and the Jaguars recovered, scoring a touchdown on their next drive to make it 17–6.  On the Browns’ next drive, Hoyer threw an interception and the Jags converted another touchdown a few seconds later, making the final score 24–6. 
After committing only 2 turnovers in their first 5 games, the Browns committed 3 turnovers against the Jaguars.  17 of the Jaguars’ 24 points came off turnovers.  The defense picked off Blake Bortles three times, but they were able to score only 3 points off of those turnovers.  Hoyer struggled mightily throughout the game, going 16/41 for 215 yards, 0 touchdowns, an interception, and a lost fumble.  It was the Browns’ lowest scoring output of the season and the fewest points that they had scored with Hoyer as their starting quarterback.  It was the first time that the Browns had failed to score a touchdown in a game since Week 2 against the Ravens (in the 2013 season). It was also the first time that the Browns failed to score any points in the second half (it last occurred in Week 2 of the 2013 season when the Browns were outscored by the Ravens 14–0 in the second half). The Jaguars won their first game of the season to improve to 1–6; The Browns’ record dropped to 3–3 as they fell to 4th place in the AFC North.

Week 8: vs. Oakland Raiders

After suffering a disappointing loss to the previously winless Jaguars the week before, the Browns faced yet another winless opponent in the Oakland Raiders.  Both teams struggled for much of the game, kicking a combined five field goals as the Browns held a 9–6-second half lead.  At the end of the third quarter the Browns finally got the break they needed when S Joe Haden recovered a Darren McFadden fumble deep in Cleveland territory and returned it 34 yards.  Four plays later, QB Brian Hoyer found WR Andrew Hawkins for a four-yard touchdown pass and a 16–6 lead.  The Raiders would never recover and the Browns, despite giving up the Raiders’ lone touchdown pass from Derek Carr to Andre Holmes with 7 seconds left, won the game 23–13.

Week 9: vs. Tampa Bay Buccaneers

Rookie WR Mike Evans, a teammate of Johnny Manziel at Texas A&M and the recipient of more than 200 catches in 2 years, was the favorite target for QB Mike Glennon, scoring both of Tampa Bay's TD's in the game. Patrick Murray added a field goal but missed three others. Cleveland blocked Murray's first FG attempt, tipped a punt that gained only 12 yards, got 2 interceptions and a fumble recovery, and kept the Bucs out of the end zone in the fourth quarter. QB Brian Hoyer passed for 300 yards and two touchdowns, with the game-winner to rookie wide receiver Taylor Gabriel.

Week 10: at Cincinnati Bengals

This was the 82nd meeting between the teams in the "Battle of Ohio." The Browns’ defense suffocated the Bengals, forcing four turnovers while limiting the Bengals’ offense to 3 points and surrendering only one red zone drive.  Bengals QB Andy Dalton struggled severely, going 10/33 for 86 yards while throwing 3 interceptions, and being sacked twice on consecutive plays by DT Desmond Bryant. His final passer rating was 2.0, the lowest in Bengals team history. Cleveland found its sea legs using the "running back by committee" approach, with all three of its starting rushers (Ben Tate, Terrence West, and Isiah Crowell) scoring TD's in compiling 170 yds on the ground. The Bengals lost their first regular season home game since Week 14 of the 2012 season (against the Cowboys).  The 21-point loss represented the Bengals’ most lopsided defeat since the Ravens routed them by 31 points in Week 13 of the 2008 season.  For the Browns, their 21-point victory marked their largest road margin since the 1993 season (when the Browns beat the L.A. Rams by 28 points), won multiple road games in a season for the first time since 2010, snapped a 5-game road losing streak to the Bengals and a 17-game road losing streak to division foes (both of which began in 2008).  The Browns’ 6–3 record is the franchise's best 9-game start since returning to the league in 1999,  and their best start since the 1994 season when the Browns opened the season with a 7–2 record.

With the convincing win, the Browns improved to 6–3.  This marked the Browns' best 9-game start to a season since 1994, when they started 7–2.  After the Steelers lost the following Sunday, the Browns held sole possession of first place in the AFC North, the first (and, as of 2021, only) time the Browns solely led a division since 1995.

Week 11: vs. Houston Texans

This marked the first of four games against potential playoff-bound teams in the Texans, Atlanta Falcons, Buffalo Bills, and Indianapolis Colts. The Browns saw their three-game winning streak end as the Texans’ defense and run game dominated the Browns in a 23–7 blowout loss. Texans DE J. J. Watt, who played tight end in high school, scored the 5th offensive TD of his career. The Browns’ lone score came in the 2nd quarter.  A touchdown from Brian Hoyer to Browns’ receiver Andrew Hawkins tied the game at 7 in the second quarter.  However, the Texans scored the final 16 points of the contest.  Hoyer struggled as he was 20/50 passing for 330 yards, throwing only one touchdown while throwing a 4th quarter interception.  It was only the second time this season that the Browns got shut out in the second half of a game, an event that also occurred in their 24–6 loss to the Jaguars.  With the loss, the Browns fell out of 1st place in the AFC North and into a tie for 3rd place behind the Bengals and Steelers, who both won that week.

Defensive linemen John Hughes and Phil Taylor were lost for the season on IR, and Jordan Cameron missed his 3rd straight game due to a concussion. On November 18, the Browns released RB Ben Tate.

This game started a stretch that lasted until the end of the 2017 season where the Browns would win only five of their next 55 games.

Week 12: at Atlanta Falcons

This was WR Josh Gordon's first action, back from his 10-game suspension. He led all receivers with 120 total yards.  Down 24–23 with 44 seconds left, Hoyer, who had 3 interceptions and 0 touchdowns, drove the ball 61 yards including the key pass to Gordon inside the 35-yard line, setting up Billy Cundiff's 2nd game-winning field goal of the season with 5 seconds left for a 26-24 victory.

With the win, the Browns improved to 7–4.  The Browns won consecutive road games for the first time since 2008 and Hoyer became the first Browns quarterback since Brian Sipe in 1980 to record consecutive 300+ yd games. S Tashaun Gipson left the game in the fourth quarter after colliding with CB Joe Haden and suffering a serious knee injury on the play. Gipson would miss the rest of the regular season.

Week 13: at Buffalo Bills

The Bills’ defense dominated the Browns in a 26–10 defeat.  The first half was low scoring; K Billy Cundiff made a 22-yard field goal for a 3-0 lead.  Several special teams errors occurred in the second quarter that prevented either team from scoring.  Cundiff missed a field goal and the Bills’ K Dan Carpenter's 53-yard field goal try was blocked by S Joe Haden. The Bills dominated the second half, scoring 20 unanswered points to seize control.  The Bills scored a touchdown early in the third to go up 7-3. On the Browns’ next drive, RB Terrance West fumbled, and the Bills recovered for a touchdown, adding a field goal in the 4th quarter to make it 17–3.  Hoyer threw an INT on the next drive, and the Bills kicked another field goal, building a 20–3 lead.  At that moment, Hoyer was benched for Johnny Manziel for the remainder of the game.  Manziel led an 80-yard touchdown drive on his first series, running for a touchdown to cut the deficit to 20–10. On Manziel's second drive, the Browns failed to gain a first down, turning the ball over on downs.  The Bills kicked 2 more field goals to make it 26–10, producing the final margin.

With the loss, the Browns fell to 7–5.

On December 3, head coach Mike Pettine announced that Hoyer would start the Browns' next game against the Indianapolis Colts.

Week 14: vs. Indianapolis Colts

The Colts rallied from a 14-point deficit in the second half to knock off the Browns, 25-24.  The defense got off to a fast start right away and dominated for 59 minutes, forcing 4 turnovers in the contest. QB Andrew Luck fumbled on the Colts’ 1 yard line, and the ball was recovered in the endzone to make it 7-0.  With a chance to go up 10-0, Browns K Billy Cundiff missed a 40 yd. field goal that would later prove to be very costly.  Following the miss, Luck rushed for a TD to tie the game at 7-7.  On the next drive, Hoyer led the Browns downfield; Rookie RB Isaiah Crowell ran in for a touchdown to lead 14-7 at halftime. In the second half, the Colts’ turnover problems continued, committing a fumble on their first drive that the Browns couldn't convert into points. Later in the quarter, Luck threw a "pick-six" to Browns rookie DB Justin Gilbert (his 1st INT of the year), and the Browns went up 21-7.  The next two Colts’ drives resulted in points (a field goal and a T. Y. Hilton touchdown), cutting the deficit to 21-16 heading into the 4th quarter. Adding another FG in the 4th to make it 21-19, and with a chance to take the lead, Luck threw another interception (he was sacked 3 times). However, the Browns failed to get a first down and were forced to settle for 3, making it 24-19 Browns and leaving the door open for the Colts to take the lead. With less than 4 minutes to go, Luck led a 90-yard game-winning touchdown drive. The Browns had a chance to end the game with a stop on 4th and inches at the 3-yard line, but RB Dan Herron avoided the tackle and picked up 2 yards for a Colts first down. Luck would throw the game-winning TD pass to Hilton on the next play, making it 25-24 Colts with 36 seconds left. After a failed two-point conversion, and with the Browns having one more chance to win the game, Hoyer threw his 2nd INT with less than 10 seconds remaining, and the Colts ran out the clock.

The Browns’ offense was barely noticeable throughout the contest. TE Jordan Cameron returned to duty after 5 weeks, leading all Browns receivers with only 41 yds. 17 of the team's 24 points came off of Colts turnovers, the defense converting two into TD's.  Punt and kick coverage teams kept returning fan-favorite KR Joshua Cribbs in check, and traded RB Trent Richardson was held to 30 yds. on 7 carries. MLB D'Qwell Jackson had 9 tackles for Indy, but no sacks. In the second half, the Browns’ offense failed to convert a single 3rd down (0/6).  For the fourth consecutive game, Hoyer was dismal, passing 14/31 for 140 yards, 0 TD's, and 2 INT's (the third straight game that Hoyer had 0 TD's and multiple INT's).  It was the second game in a row that the Browns failed to win after holding a halftime lead.  It was only the second time that the Browns lost when holding a 4th quarter lead at any point (the other loss coming to the Ravens in Week 3).

With the loss, the Browns fell to 7–6 on the season; wins by the Steelers and Ravens would leave the Browns in 4th place in the AFC North.  It was the first time this season that the Browns lost back-to-back games.

On December 9, it was announced that Johnny Manziel would start over the struggling Brian Hoyer. Starting G Ryan Seymour moved to center, replacing Nick McDonald as the team's 4th center to start a game. He was finish the season at that position. K Billy Cundiff was released from the team on December 13, replaced by Garrett Hartley.

Week 15: vs. Cincinnati Bengals

This was the second regular season meeting between the two teams.  The Browns, having won the first meeting in Cincinnati, were looking to sweep the season series for the first time since 2002.  However, the Bengals throttled the Browns in a 30–0 defeat, dominating from start to finish.  The Bengals pounced on the Browns early, scoring a touchdown on their opening drive.  They went up 20–0 in the first half and never looked back.  Manziel was awful in his first start for the Browns, going 10/18 for 80 yards, 0 touchdowns, and 2 interceptions. The Browns’ 38 offensive plays were the lowest in the NFL this season.

The Browns were shut out in a game for the first time since 2009 season and remains the most recent time they have been shut out. The 30-point margin of defeat was the Browns’ largest margin of defeat since 2011.  The Browns extended their losing streak in December games, having lost 10 consecutive games, dating back to 2012.

With the loss, the fell to 7–7.  They finished 4–4 at home.  The Browns were mathematically eliminated from AFC North title contention. The Browns have now gone 22 consecutive seasons without a division title, the longest active streak in the league.

Week 16: at Carolina Panthers

One day before this game, the San Diego Chargers defeated the San Francisco 49ers.  The Chargers' victory mathematically eliminated the Browns from postseason contention.

The Browns entered this game playing for pride and looking to sweep the NFC South.  In a low scoring first half, the Panthers jumped out to a 10-3 lead. QB Johnny Manziel got off to another slow start, going 3 for 8 with only 32 passing yards.  The Browns gained only 2 first downs with Manziel in the first half (with one first down coming via penalty).  With less than two minutes remaining in the first half, Manziel injured his hamstring, and was ruled out for the rest of the game. In the third quarter, the Browns added a field goal from newly signed K Garrett Hartley, cutting the deficit to 10-6.  In the fourth quarter, Hoyer threw an 81-yard TD pass to TE Jordan Cameron, and the Browns led 13-10.  However, the Panthers would score the go-ahead touchdown on their next drive and go up 17-13.  With the Browns facing a 4th and 11 at midfield, HC Mike Pettine elected to punt.  The Browns' defense couldn't force a punt or turnover, and the Panthers ran out the clock.

With the loss, the Browns fell to 7-8 and guaranteed a finish in fourth place in the AFC North.

On December 26, due to injuries to both Hoyer and Manziel, Connor Shaw was announced to be the starting quarterback for the Browns’ Week 17 matchup against the Ravens.  On December 27, WR Josh Gordon was suspended for the season finale for a violation of team rules.

Week 17: at Baltimore Ravens

In the season finale against the Ravens, undrafted rookie QB Connor Shaw started the game as the team's 3rd starting QB for the season. Defensive and kicking units kept the game close, as both offenses were disrupted for the entire first half; K's Justin Tucker and Garrett Hartley scored field goals for a 3-3 tie. In the third quarter, the Browns got key plays from Shaw and rookie RB Terrence West, as he scored on a 2-yard run to take the lead 10-3.
Because of the amount of plays on the field for the defense, however, they ran out of gas in the fourth, and QB Joe Flacco led Baltimore to 17 straight unanswered points, including a pair of passing TD's to Kamar Aiken and Torrey Smith, for the Ravens’ 20-10 win.

With the loss, the Browns finished the season 7–9.  This marked the team's seventh consecutive season with a losing record and 14th in their 16 seasons since returning to the NFL in 1999.  The Browns finished 3–5 in away games.

Standings and Postseason

On December 23, Pro Bowl selections were announced for the season: S Tashaun Gipson, CB Joe Haden, and OT Joe Thomas were named starters for the Pro Bowl.  This marked Thomas' eighth straight Pro Bowl selection, making him the first offensive lineman in NFL history to be nominated in each of his first eight seasons.  On January 19, S Donte Whitner was added to the Pro Bowl roster, his third career selection.

On January 3, 2015, Thomas was named to the Associated Press’ 2014 NFL All-Pro team for the fifth time. On January 12, the Pro Football Writers' Assn. named Thomas to the All-NFL team while G Joel Bitonio joined Thomas on the All-AFC team. Bitonio was one of only two rookies on the squad.

The Browns' 25-point comeback win over the Tennessee Titans was selected as a finalist for the GMC "Never Say Never" moment of 2014.

On January 28, Haden was named a Global Ambassador for the Special Olympics. He became the first American professional football player to ever hold the title.

Division

Conference

Staff

Final roster

References

External links
  
 2014 Cleveland Browns at Pro Football Reference (Profootballreference.com)
 2014 Cleveland Browns Statistics at jt-sw.com
 2014 Cleveland Browns Schedule at jt-sw.com
 2014 Cleveland Browns at DatabaseFootball.com  

Cleveland
Cleveland Browns seasons
Cleveland